Bathurst Island (Iwaidja: Nguyu) is one of the Tiwi Islands in the Northern Territory off the northern coast of Australia along with Melville Island.


Description
The largest settlement on Bathurst is Wurrumiyanga (known as Nguiu until 2010), in the south-east, with a population of around 1,560.

History

Aboriginal Australians have occupied the area that became the Tiwi Islands for at least 40,000 years.

On 5 May 1623, Willem Jootszoon Van Colster  (or Coolsteerdt), in the ship Arnhem named the island De Speult Eylandt, in honour of Herman van Speult, Governor of Ambon, who had commissioned the voyage of exploration.

In 1828, the island was named Bathurst Island by Scottish explorer John Clements Wickham, after the explorer Phillip Parker King's ship which had explored the area in August 1821. He named the island during a voyage in March 1838 when he was second in command of HMS Beagle in Charles Darwin's expedition. The ship's name honours Henry Bathurst, 3rd Earl Bathurst, (1762-1834), former British Secretary of State for the Colonies.

From 1910 to 1938 the island was the site of the Roman Catholic mission of Francis Xavier Gsell, known as the "Bishop with 150 wives" for his practice of "buying" girls betrothed to older men, thus making it possible for them to marry men of their own age.

On 24 December 1912 the whole island was proclaimed an Aboriginal reserve, under the Northern Territory Aboriginals Act 1910. A series of documents show that previous to the proclamation (published in the Commonwealth Gazette on 18 January 1913), there had been discussion about two parcels of land on the island. One was the allocation of  allocated to the Mission, which would continue on annual leases, and the second regarding  which was previously allocated as Crown Land under the Northern Territory Tropical Products Act 1904, for the production of cotton and other tropical crops. The correspondence shows that this was decided to be undesirable from the point of view of the Aboriginal people, both because of the bad influence of white men and the need to import labour to use on the leases.

Before the bombing of Darwin, a Missionary of the Sacred Heart priest, Ed Bennett, saw the approaching Japanese bombers, and urged the resident coastwatcher, John Gribble, to send a warning to Darwin, but Gribble refused. He said it would have to be sent in code, and he did not have the relevant code books. The first wave of 188 Japanese planes was also spotted by another missionary on the island, Father John McGrath, who sent a message on the radio saying "An unusually large air formation bearing down on us from the northwest". However, ten US P-40E Kittyhawk fighters were returning to Darwin after aborting a mission to Timor due to bad weather, and the Australian duty officer assumed this was the same formation, and the warning was not acted upon.

In film
Bathurst Island was depicted as Mission Island in the 2008 Baz Luhrmann film Australia. In the film, Japanese infantrymen land on the island; however, the presence of Japanese troops on the island is entirely fictional, as no such landing by the Japanese was made during World War II.

Notable people
 Olive May Pearce

Notes and references

Further reading

 Bathurst island (Encyclopædia Britannica)
 Bathurst Island (Walkabout)

External links
 Tiwi Land Council

Tiwi Islands
Australian Aboriginal freehold title